The Asia/Oceania Zone was one of the three zones of the regional Davis Cup competition in 1988.

In the Asia/Oceania Zone there were two different tiers, called groups, in which teams competed against each other to advance to the upper tier.

Group I
The winner of Group I was promoted to the following year's World Group. Teams who lost their respective first-round ties competed in the relegation play-off, with the winning team remaining in Group I, whereas the losing team was relegated to the Asia/Oceania Zone Group II in 1989.

Participating nations

Draw

  are promoted to the World Group in 1989.

  are relegated to Group II in 1989.

First round

Philippines vs. Japan

Indonesia vs. Thailand

Second round

South Korea vs. Philippines

Indonesia vs. China

Relegation play-off

Thailand vs. Japan

Third round

Indonesia vs. South Korea

Group II
The winner in Group II advanced to the Asia/Oceania Zone Group I in 1989.

Participating nations

Draw

  are promoted to Group I in 1989.

First round

Sri Lanka vs. Malaysia

Second round

Hong Kong vs. Iraq

Syria vs. Singapore

Chinese Taipei vs. Bangladesh

Sri Lanka vs. Pakistan

Third round

Hong Kong vs. Singapore

Chinese Taipei vs. Pakistan

Fourth round

Hong Kong vs. Pakistan

References

External links
Davis Cup official website

Davis Cup Asia/Oceania Zone
Asia Oceania Zone